Ian Curtis (1956–1980) was an English musician and the lead singer of Joy Division.

Ian Curtis may also refer to:

 Ian Curtis (cricketer) (born 1959), British cricketer
 Ian Curtis (actor) (born 1972), British actor
 Ian Curtis Wishlist, a song by Xiu Xiu on the 2003 album A Promise

See also
 Ian Curteis (born 1935), British director